Forever the Tourist is a studio album by Daryl Braithwaite released in October 2013. It was his first album of original material since Snapshot in 2005. It was released through Sony Music Australia who had re-signed Braithwaite after releasing the multi-platinum albums Edge (1988) and Rise (1990).
He promoted the album was a number of concerts throughout October 2013.

Background
In 2008, Braithwaite began a songwriting collaboration with Oliver Jones (brother of Savage Garden's Daniel Jones). Braithwaite explained, "We met through mutual friends, and hit it off quickly." By mid 2012, the new songs reached Denis Handlin, chairman and CEO of Sony Music Australia who signed Braithwaite.

Track listing
 "Forever The Tourist" (Oliver Jones) - 4:25
 "Not Too Late" (Daryl Braithwaite, Lindsay Rimes, Simon Shapiro) - 3:44 
 "Beautiful Feeling" (Daryl Braithwaite, Oliver Jones) - 3:27
 "Good People" (Oliver Jones)- 3:31
 "Is This Love" (Daryl Braithwaite, Scott Kingman) - 3:34
 "Perfect Day" (Daryl Braithwaite, Oliver Jones) - 3:59
 "See You Smile" (Daryl Braithwaite, Oliver Jones) - 3:47
 "Mountain" (Daryl Braithwaite, Oliver Jones) - 4:06

Weekly charts

Release history

References

2013 albums
Daryl Braithwaite albums
Sony Music Australia albums